Logica Universalis is a peer-reviewed academic journal which covers research related to universal logic.

External links 
 

Logic journals
Biannual journals
English-language journals
Publications established in 2007
Springer Science+Business Media academic journals